Jibrin Isah  (born 28 February 1960) is Nigerian politician and banker, who is the senator representing Kogi East Senatorial District of Kogi State at the 9th National Assembly.

Education
Isah attended the LGEA Primary School, Ajiolo-Ojaji from 1967 to 1972. He proceeded to the Our Lady of School, Anyigba, for his secondary education between 1973 and 1977. He got his B.sc degree in Economics at the Bayero University Kano in 1983. He got his masters in Economics at the University of Lagos in 1991. He got another masters in Petroleum and Energy at the University of Ibadan in 2002. He obtained his MBA at the University of Nigeria in 2003.

Professional career
In 1988, he joined Chase Merchant Bank Plc as an analyst. He moved to Afribank International Limited (Merchant Bankers) in 1991 as the head of Project Finance/Leasing Department. He was made the head of Capital Market group in 1993. In 1998, he was the Managing Director/Chief Executive of AIL Securities Limited.

Polictical career
In 2011, he contested for the governorship ticket of the People's Democratic Party and lost to Idris Wada. In 2015, he contested to the aspirant in the People's Democratic Party primaries and lost to the Incumbent Idris Wada.

In the 2019 general election, he was elected as the senator representing Kogi East after a supplementary election. He polled 134,189 votes while Ali Atai Aidoko, the candidate of the PDP, polled 74,201 votes.

References

1960 births
Living people
Members of the Senate (Nigeria) from Kogi State
All Progressives Congress politicians
Bayero University Kano alumni
University of Lagos alumni
University of Ibadan alumni
University of Nigeria alumni